Wingnut may refer to:

Botany
Pterocarya, a genus of trees bearing winged nuts
Terminalia canescens, a species of tree native to northern Australia

Entertainment 
Wing Nuts: Battle in the Sky, a video game created by Rocket Science Games
Wingnut, a character in the Care Bears franchise introduced in the movie Care Bears: Oopsy Does It!
WingNuts: Temporal Navigator, a computer game created by Freeverse Software

Slang terms 
Wingnut (politics), an American slang term for a person who holds extreme political views
Wingnut, an eccentric person
Wingnut, a fan of the NBC television drama series The West Wing
Wingnut, a fan of the Detroit Red Wings
Wingnut, a fan of the video game series Wing Commander
Wingnut, military slang for members of the United States Air Force
Wingnut, a Honda Gold Wing motorcycle enthusiast
Wingnut, an Australian term for someone whose ears stick out

Sports 
Wingnut, nickname of Robert Weaver (surfer) (born 1965), an American surfer
Wichita Wingnuts, a Wichita, Kansas, baseball team
Wingnut, nickname of Australian cricketer Adam Gilchrist
WingNuts, name of a capsized sports boat involving fatalities in the 2011 Chicago Yacht Club Race to Mackinac

Other uses
WingNut Films,  film production company owned by Peter Jackson
Wingnut (hardware), a nut with a pair of wings to enable it to be easily turned by hand